Blues is a blues rock compilation album by Eric Clapton released in 1999. The release features songs from Clapton's 1970s RSO albums, as well as some unreleased material from the same era. The second disc features live recordings.

Track listing

Disc one (studio blues) 
 "Before You Accuse Me (Take a Look at Yourself)" (Ellas McDaniel) – 4:39 (Previously unreleased acoustic outtake from Backless, 1978)
 "Mean Old World" (Walter Jacobs) – 3:50 (Outtake from Layla and Other Assorted Love Songs, 1970)
 "Ain't That Lovin' You" (Jimmy Reed) – 5:26
 "The Sky Is Crying" (Elmore James) – 3:58
 "Cryin'" (Eric Clapton) – 2:52
 "Have You Ever Loved a Woman" (Billy Myles) – 6:51 - Derek and the Dominos
 "Alberta" (Traditional) – 2:40 (Previously unreleased outtake from Slowhand, 1977)
 "Early in the Morning" (Traditional arranged by Eric Clapton) – 7:55
 "Give Me Strength" (Clapton) – 2:51
 "Meet Me (Down at the Bottom)" (Willie Dixon) – 7:04 (Previously unreleased outtake from 461 Ocean Boulevard, 1974)
 "County Jail Blues" (Alfred Fields) – 3:56
 "Floating Bridge" (Sleepy John Estes) – 6:33
 "Blow Wind Blow" (Muddy Waters) – 2:59
 "To Make Somebody Happy" (Clapton) – 5:11
 "Before You Accuse Me (Take a Look at Yourself)" (McDaniel) – 4:39 (Previously unreleased electric outtake from Backless, 1978)

Disc two (live blues) 
 "Stormy Monday" (T-Bone Walker) – 12:49 (Hammersmith Odeon, Hammersmith, London, England, 27 April 1977), from Crossroads vol. 2: Live in the Seventies
 "Worried Life Blues" (Big Maceo Merriweather) – 5:57 (Victoria Hall, Hanley, Staffordshire, Stoke-on-Trent, England, 28 November 1978), from Crossroads vol. 2: Live in the Seventies
 "Early in the Morning" (Traditional arranged by Eric Clapton) – 7:11 (Budokan, Tokyo, Japan, 3 December 1979), from Just One Night
 "Have You Ever Loved a Woman" (Billy Myles) – 7:47 (Long Beach Arena, Long Beach, California, 19 July 1974), from Crossroads vol. 2: Live in the Seventies
 "Wonderful Tonight" (Clapton) – 6:23 (Glasgow Apollo, Glasgow, Scotland, 24 November 1978), from Crossroads vol. 2: Live in the Seventies
 "Kind Hearted Woman" (Robert Johnson) – 5:11 (Glasgow Apollo, Glasgow, Scotland, 24 November 1978), from Crossroads vol. 2: Live in the Seventies
 "Double Trouble" (Otis Rush) – 8:02 (Budokan, Tokyo, Japan, 3 December 1979), from Just One Night
 "Driftin' Blues" (Charles Brown/Johnny Moore/Eddie Williams) – 6:57 (Civic Center, Providence, Rhode Island, 25 June 1975), from Crossroads vol. 2: Live in the Seventies
 "Crossroads" (Robert Johnson) – 5:49 (Victoria Hall, Hanley, Staffordshire, Stoke-on-Trent, England, 28 November 1978), from Crossroads vol. 2: Live in the Seventies
 "Further on Up the Road" (Joe Medwich Veasey/Don Robey) – 8:38 (Convention Centre, Dallas, 15 November 1976) from Freddie King 1934-1976

Bonus disc (included with some early copies of the album) 
 "Blues in A" (Clapton) – 10:25 (Previously unreleased jam outtake from Eric Clapton, 1970)
 "Eric After Hours Blues" (Clapton) – 4:20 (Previously unreleased jam outtake from 461 Ocean Boulevard)
 "B Minor Jam" (Clapton) – 7:10 (Previously unreleased jam outtake from 461 Ocean Boulevard)
 "Blues" (Clapton) – 2:59 (Previously unreleased jam outtake from No Reason to Cry, 1976)

Personnel 
Duane Allman – guitar, performer
Jon Astley – engineer, mixing
John Bellissimo – photography
Gary Brooker – keyboards, vocals
Philip Chapman – mixing
Eric Clapton – dobro, guitar, arranger, vocals
The Dominoes – arranger, producer
Tom Dowd – producer, executive producer
Yvonne Elliman – vocals
Rob Fraboni – producer
Jim Gordon – drums (bass)
Suha Gur – digital mastering, mixing, digital compilation
Al Jackson Jr. – drums
John Jansen – mixing
Glyn Johns – producer, engineer
Freddie King – guitar
Leadbelly – arranger
Albert Lee – guitar, vocals
Bill Levenson – mixing, compilation producer
Marcy Levy – vocals
Andy MacPherson – mixing
Jay Mark – mixing
Dave Markee – bass
Dave Mason – guitar
John McDermott – liner notes
Bill Oakes – producer
Jamie Oldaker – drums
Sergio Pastora – percussion
Ron Pownall – photography
Michael Putland – photography
Carl Radle – bass
Jerry Rappaport – project assistant
Steve Rinkoff – mixing
Dick Sims – organ, piano
Henry Spinetti – percussion, drums
Chris Stainton – keyboards
Jackie Stansfield – project coordinator
George Terry – guitar
Terri Tierney – project coordinator
Laurens Van Houten – photography
Bobby Whitlock – piano
Ron Wood – guitar

Chart performance

Weekly charts

Certifications

References

Eric Clapton compilation albums
1999 compilation albums
1999 live albums
Eric Clapton live albums
PolyGram live albums
PolyGram compilation albums